State Route 62 (SR 62), also known as Monsanto Road, is a  state highway near Guntersville in Marshall County. The highway heads east from lakeside homes and marinas along Lake Guntersville to SR 227 near Guntersville.

SR 62 previously provided access to a (now abandoned) Monsanto plant, for which it was built and named.

Route description

History

The current incarnation of SR 62 was designated in 1995. Before then, the roadway was an unsigned county route. SR 62 is a four-lane divided roadway that serves to connect lakeside homes and marinas along Lake Guntersville with U.S. Route 431 (US 431) and SR 69 and SR 79 via SR 227. At its western end was the entrance to the now abandoned Monsanto production facility, which was the reason for SR 62 being built.

Between 1964 and 1993, SR 62 was assigned to the highway connecting Ohatchee and Alexandria in Calhoun County. That route is now signed as SR 144.

Major intersections

See also

References

External links

062
Transportation in Marshall County, Alabama